Deadly earthquakes may refer to:
List of deadly earthquakes since 1900
List of natural disasters by death toll#Earthquakes
Lists of earthquakes#Deadliest earthquakes (by year)